Hans Jensen Blom  (19 May 1812 – 13 April 1875)  was a Norwegian politician and clergyman.

Hans Jensen Blom was from Skien in Telemark county, Norway.

He was elected to the Norwegian Parliament in 1848, representing the constituency of Stavanger. He worked as a chaplain there, but was then appointed vicar (sogneprest) in the countryside, being re-elected in 1851 and 1854 from Stavanger Amt. He was appointed vicar in Kinn at the Kinn Church in 1854, and was elected to Parliament from the constituency Nordre Bergenhuus Amt (now Sogn og Fjordane) in 1859 and 1862. In 1862 he moved to Melhus, and represented Søndre Trondhjems Amt (now Sør-Trøndelag)  as a deputy representative in 1868.

See also
Blom (family from Skien)

References

1812 births
1875 deaths
Politicians from Skien
Members of the Storting
Politicians from Stavanger
Sogn og Fjordane politicians
Norwegian priest-politicians
Norwegian chaplains